Balaklava Bay or Balaclava Bay may refer to:

 A bay near Balaklava, Ukraine
 A bay near Portland Harbour, Dorset, southern England